C.L.E.A.N. is a 2020 Croatian horror-thriller from Vjekoslav Katusin. Costas Mandylor and Tom Sizemore take part in supporting roles. The film was published by Dream Team Pictures under the name Čistilište together with the Austrian cinema chain Cineplexx. It was released in Serbia, Montenegro & Bosnia for several weeks starting in October 2020.

Plot 
C.L.E.A.N. is about four patients who all suffer from various addictions such as the addiction to alcohol, drugs and sex. In his sanatorium, Dr. Sutter offers a cure in which he uses the C.L.E.A.N. (Cerebral Lateralization Enforcement and Neuroactivation) program that he practices modifying the behavioral patterns of the brain in order to heal his patients. What looks like hope at first glance turns into chaos, which is ultimately about pure survival. Only the patient Alice, who has been plagued by fear and visions from a very young age, especially because she has witnessed the gruesome murder of her own mother, realizes that something is wrong and is ultimately in the clutches of a perfidious pact.

Cast 
Costas Mandylor as Dr. Sutter
Tom Sizemore as Mr. Wilkens
Jenny Paris as Alice
Fred Lobin as Noah Bishop
Maik van Epple as Joe 
Lou Cefair as Luzifer

Production 
In 2016, the screenwriter Axel Melzner, who works for the film production company Dream Team Pictures, recommended the renowned author Konstantin Georgiou, who studied at the New York Film Academy, for the development of the C.L.E.A.N. script. The plot was inspired by films such as Guardians of the Galaxy and The Avengers, in which the credits refer to an antagonist who is supposed to occupy a leading role in future film productions. C.L.E.A.N. is similarly intended as a prequel for the upcoming film The Vultures Are Waiting, which is set to be a modern Desperado-style western.

As Location for the shooting of C.L.E.A.N. an urban villa in the Croatian coastal town of Pula on the Istrian peninsula was selected. The Bunker Studios in Serbia were jointly responsible for the computer-generated effects.

Reception 
On October 18, 2020, C.L.E.A.N. presented at the 14th Festival of Serbian Fantastic Film (FSFF) in Belgrade. Subsequently, the film received several awards from various international film festivals.

References

External links 
 

2020 films
Croatian horror films